Deansville is an unincorporated community located in the town of Medina, Dane County, Wisconsin, United States.

History
The community was named for Richard Dean, who became the first postmaster in 1860.

Notes

Unincorporated communities in Dane County, Wisconsin
Unincorporated communities in Wisconsin